Allington Quarry is a  geological Site of Special Scientific Interest north of Maidstone in Kent. It is a Geological Conservation Review site.

This Pleistocene site has an extensive section through gulls (cracks in the rock) which are filled with loess. These were probably produced by seasonal freezing and thawing during the last ice age.

The site is private land with no public access.

References

Sites of Special Scientific Interest in Kent
Geological Conservation Review sites
Quarries in Kent